Tulsk was a constituency represented in the Irish House of Commons from 1611 to 1800.

Members of Parliament

1692–1801

References

Historic constituencies in County Roscommon
Constituencies of the Parliament of Ireland (pre-1801)
1611 establishments in Ireland
1800 disestablishments in Ireland
Constituencies established in 1611
Constituencies disestablished in 1800